A More Perfect Constitution is a book published by American political scientist at the University of Virginia, Larry J. Sabato, in which he proposes a constitutional convention to substantially overhaul the United States Constitution. He points out that after the Bill of Rights, there have only been seventeen constitutional amendments over the past 220 years. He argues that a constitutional convention is overdue and is something that the Founding Fathers would have wanted. He offers 23 proposals for revising the Constitution.

Sabato's proposals

The twenty-three proposals run the gamut from changing the length of the U.S. President's term in office and the number and terms of Supreme Court justices to altering the structure of Congress, modifying the Electoral College, and introducing universal national service.  Each of his proposals could be implemented with concurrence of 2/3 of each house of Congress and 3/4 of the states, except for the proposal to give some states more Senators than others.  That proposal would require concurrence from every state.

Congress
 Expand the Senate to 136 members to have it be more representative. His plan would give the ten most populous states two additional senators each, and give the next fifteen most populous states one additional senator, and would give the District of Columbia one senator.
 Appoint all former presidents and vice presidents to the new office of "National Senator" to serve national interests instead of state interests and bring presidential experience to the Senate.
 Mandate non-partisan redistricting for House elections to enhance electoral competition and lessen the influence of gerrymandering.
 Lengthen the terms of representatives from two years to three years, and set Senate terms to coincide with all presidential elections, so the entire House and Senate would be elected at the same time as the President.
 Expand the size of the House of Representatives to approximately 1,000 members from the current total of 435, so House members can be closer to their constituents, and to level the playing field in House elections.
 Establish term limits in the House and Senate to restore the Founders' principle of frequent rotation in office.
 Add a Balanced Budget Amendment to encourage fiscal fairness to future generations.
 Create a Continuity of Government procedure to provide for the replacement of senators and representatives in the event of extensive deaths or incapacitation as may happen as a result of a major disaster such as a large scale nuclear attack.

Presidency
 Establish a new six-year, one-time presidential term with the option for the President to seek two additional years if approved by a referendum of the American people.
 Limit some presidential war-making powers and expand Congress' oversight of war-making.
 Give the president a line-item veto.
 Allow people not born in the United States to run for president or vice president after having been a citizen for 20 years.

Supreme Court
 Eliminate lifetime tenure for federal judges in favor of non-renewable 15-year terms for all federal judges.
 Grant Congress the power to set a mandatory retirement age for all federal judges.
 Expand the size of the Supreme Court from 9 to 12 to be more representative.
 Give federal judges guaranteed cost of living increases so pay is never an issue.

Politics
 Write a new constitutional article specifically for the politics of the American system.
 Adopt a regional, staggered lottery system, over four months, for presidential party nominations to avoid the destructive front-loading of primaries.
 Keep the Electoral College, as the previously suggested House and Senate reforms would preserve the benefits of the College while minimizing the chances a president will win without a majority of the popular vote.
 Reform campaign financing by preventing wealthy candidates from financing their campaigns. Mandate partial public financing for House and Senate campaigns to lessen the impact of lobbyists and fundraisers.
 Adopt an automatic registration system for all qualified American citizens to guarantee that their right to vote is not abridged by bureaucratic requirements.

Universal national service
 Create a constitutional requirement that all able-bodied young Americans devote at least two years of their lives in service to the country.

National constitutional convention
 Convene a new constitutional convention using the state-based mechanism left to Americans by the framers in the current constitution.

See also
 Lawrence Lessig, prominent scholar advocating for a new constitution

Notes

References

External links
 Official website

2007 non-fiction books
Books about politics of the United States
United States constitutional commentary